The Women's 50 metre rifle prone event was held on 12 April 2018 at the Belmont Shooting Centre, Brisbane.

Results

References

External links
Schedule

Shooting at the 2018 Commonwealth Games
Comm